Franklin County is a county on the eastern border of the U.S. state of Indiana. In the 2020 United States Census, the county population was 22,785. The county seat is the town of Brookville. Franklin County is part of the Cincinnati, OH–KY–IN Metropolitan Statistical Area. The only incorporated city in Franklin County is Batesville, which lies mostly in adjoining Ripley County.

Geography
Franklin County lies on the eastern edge of Indiana; its eastern border abuts the western border of Ohio. Its low rolling hills, once completely wooded, have been partially cleared and leveled for agricultural use. The carved drainages are still largely brush-filled.

Brookville Lake extends into the county's northern part, formed by a dam of the same name on the East Branch of the Whitewater River, a tributary of the Great Miami River. The West Branch of the Whitewater River enters the county's northwestern part from Fayette County and joins the east branch at Brookville, to form the Whitewater River, flowing southeastward into Dearborn County. The southern and southwestern parts of Franklin County are drained by Salt Creek, Pipe Creek, and Blue Creek, which flow northeastward into Whitewater River.

Adjacent counties

 Fayette County - north
 Union County - northeast
 Butler County, Ohio - east
 Hamilton County, Ohio - southeast
 Dearborn County - south
 Ripley County - southwest
 Decatur County - west
 Rush County - northwest

Major highways

  Interstate 74
  U.S. Route 52
  Indiana State Road 1
  Indiana State Road 46
  Indiana State Road 101
  Indiana State Road 121
  Indiana State Road 229
  Indiana State Road 244
  Indiana State Road 252

Protected areas
 Mounds State Recreation Area

Lakes
 Brookville Lake (part)

Communities

City
 Batesville (partial)

Towns

 Brookville (county seat)
 Cedar Grove
 Laurel
 Mount Carmel
 Oldenburg
 West Harrison (partial)

Census-designated places
 Lake Santee (partial)
 Metamora
 New Trenton

Unincorporated communities

 Andersonville
 Bath
 Blooming Grove
 Buena Vista
 Drewersburg
 Enochsburg
 Fairfield (extinct)
 Hamburg
 Highland Center
 Huntersville
 Klemmes Corner
 Lake View
 Midway
 Millville
 Mixersville
 Mound Haven
 Mount Auburn
 New Fairfield
 Oak Forest
 Old Bath
 Palestine
 Peoria
 Peppertown
 Raymond
 Rockdale
 Saint Marys
 Saint Peter
 Scipio (part)
 Sharptown
 South Gate
 Stavetown
 Whitcomb
 Yellow Bank
 Youngs Corner

Townships

 Bath Township
 Blooming Grove Township
 Brookville Township
 Butler Township
 Fairfield Township
 Highland Township
 Laurel Township
 Metamora Township
 Posey Township
 Ray Township
 Salt Creek Township
 Springfield Township
 Whitewater Township

History
The future state of Indiana was first regulated by congressional passage of the Northwest Ordinance in 1787. In 1790 the Territory was divided into two counties, with Knox covering much of present-day Indiana. In 1810, a portion of Knox was partitioned to create Wayne County, and shortly thereafter a portion further south was partitioned to create Franklin; the authorizing act was dated 1 February 1811. It was named for statesman Benjamin Franklin.

Some early settlers of Franklin County were Primitive Baptists who came with Elder William Tyner from Virginia in 1797, after the American Revolutionary War. They organized the first church congregation in the Whitewater Valley, the Little Cedar Grove Baptist Church. They raised a log chapel southeast of Brookville in 1805.

Another European-American landmark is the Big Cedar Baptist Church and Burying Ground on Big Cedar Creek Road, between the road to Reily and the Oxford Pike. The original church was established in 1817, as an arm of the Little Cedar Baptist church. The brick building was built in 1838. This church congregation, similar to many pioneer Baptist groups in the country, was originally Primitive Baptist or Hardshell. In the 1830s modernism reached the county, bringing innovations such as Sunday schools, Missionary Societies, and the playing of organs. Organs were particularly anathema to the Primitive Party, who considered it akin to Aaron's golden calf.

The Big Cedar congregation divided into two over these issues, but the two groups arrived at an amicable settlement. Both congregations continued to use the same building: the Primitives, or Hardshells, had worship in the church on the first and third Sabbath of each month, and the Modernists or Missionary Baptists used the church on the second and fourth Sundays. Each congregation had a wood shed. The building is now maintained in connection with the Big Cedar Cemetery Association.

Governors James B. Ray, Noah Noble and David Wallace were known as the "Brookville Triumvirate." They had each lived in Brookville and were elected to consecutive terms as Indiana governor. Noble and Ray were political adversaries.

James B. Goudie Jr. (1769-1836), Speaker of the Indiana House, was also from Franklin County.

Climate and weather

Government

The county government is a constitutional body, and is granted specific powers by the Constitution of Indiana, and by the Indiana Code.

County Council: The legislative branch of the county government; controls spending and revenue collection in the county. Representatives are elected to four-year terms from county districts. They set salaries, the annual budget, and special spending. The council has limited authority to impose local taxes, in the form of an income and property tax that is subject to state level approval, excise taxes, and service taxes.

Board of Commissioners: The executive body of the county; commissioners are elected county-wide to staggered four-year terms. One commissioner serves as president. The commissioners execute acts legislated by the council, collect revenue, and manage county government.

County Officials: The county has other elected offices, including sheriff, coroner, auditor, treasurer, recorder, surveyor, and circuit court clerk. These officers are elected to four-year terms. Members elected to county government positions are required to declare party affiliations and to be residents of the county.

Franklin County is part of Indiana's 6th congressional district; Indiana Senate districts 42 and 43; and Indiana House of Representatives districts 55, 67 and 68.

Demographics

2010 Census
As of the 2010 United States Census, there were 23,087 people, 8,579 households, and 6,447 families in the county. The racial makeup of the county was 98.3% white, 0.2% black or African American, 0.2% Asian, 0.1% American Indian, 0.3% from other races, and 0.8% from two or more races. Those of Hispanic or Latino origin made up 0.9% of the population. In terms of ancestry, 40.3% were German, 14.7% were American, 13.1% were Irish, and 9.5% were English.

Of the 8,579 households, 35.9% had children under the age of 18 living with them, 61.6% were married couples living together, 8.4% had a female householder with no husband present, 24.9% were non-families, and 20.5% of all households were made up of individuals. The average household size was 2.67 and the average family size was 3.07. The median age was 40.0 years.

The median income for a household in the county was $47,697 and the median income for a family was $60,300. Males had a median income of $43,443 versus $32,612 for females. The per capita income for the county was $23,090. About 8.6% of families and 11.7% of the population were below the poverty line, including 16.8% of those under age 18 and 10.9% of those age 65 or over.

2020 census

See also
 National Register of Historic Places listings in Franklin County, Indiana

References

 
Indiana counties
1811 establishments in Indiana Territory
Populated places established in 1811
Sundown towns in Indiana